The Royal Perth Golfing Society, or its full name of The Royal Perth Golfing Society & County and City Club, is a golfing and private members club in Perth, Scotland, with premises overlooking the North Inch.

History 
The Perth Golfing Society was formed in 1824.

In 1833 King William IV granted the Society his Royal Patronage. This was the very first grant of royal patronage to a Golfing Society, notably a year before The Royal and Ancient Golf Club of St Andrews, which is often wrongly presumed to be the first. 
There  are now over 70 clubs throughout the world entitled to use the name 'Royal' and Perth is  proud to be the oldest.

See also
List of golf clubs granted Royal status

Further reading

External links

1824 establishments in Scotland
Sports clubs established in the 1820s
Golf clubs and courses in Perth and Kinross
Perth Golfing Society
Sport in Perth, Scotland
Gentlemen's clubs in Scotland
Organizations established in 1824
Royal golf clubs